The 1952 United States Senate special election in Nebraska took place on November 2, 1952. Kenneth S. Wherry was elected to the term in 1948. Following his death, State Senator Fred A. Seaton was appointed to the vacancy. Dwight Griswold was elected to complete Wherry's term, defeating William Ritchie. The election was held alongside a regular election. Griswold underperformed Dwight D. Eisenhower, who won the state with 69.15% of the vote in the presidential election.

Democratic primary

Candidates
William Ritchie, chairman of the Nebraska Democratic Committee
Henry L. Fillman, farmer and insurance businessman

Results

Republican primary

Candidates
Dwight Griswold, former Governor of Nebraska

Results

Results

References 

Nebraska 1952
Nebraska 1952
1952 Special
Nebraska Special
United States Senate Special
United States Senate 1952